The 1971 Valley State Matadors football team represented San Fernando Valley State College—now known as California State University, Northridge—as a member of the California Collegiate Athletic Association (CCAA) during the 1971 NCAA College Division football season. Led by first-year head coach Rod Humenuik, Valley State compiled an overall record of 4–7 with a mark of 1–2 in conference play, placing third in the CCAA. The Matadors played home games at the new campus stadium, North Campus Stadium in Northridge, California.

Schedule

Team players in the NFL
The following Valley State players were selected in the 1972 NFL Draft.

References

Valley State
Cal State Northridge Matadors football seasons
Valley State Matadors football